All India Agricultural, Industrial, Educational and Cultural Exhibition or commonly called the Thrissur Pooram Exhibition is an exhibition organised jointly by Paramekkavu Bagavathi Temple Devaswom and Thiruvambadi Sri Krishna Temple Devaswom, ahead of Thrissur Pooram in Thekkinkadu Maidan in Thrissur city. It is usually conducted over a period of 40 to 50 days during the Thrissur Pooram.The exhibition is the largest in Kerala in terms of attendance and floor space.

History
The exhibition was organised by the youths in freedom fighters in Thrissur City. It was started in 1932 and was known as Swadeshi Exhibition till 1947. Later Thrissur Municipal Corporation took over the event till 1967 and was known as All India Agricultural, Industrial and Educational Exhibition. In 1963 Thrissur Municipal Corporation handed over the exhibition to Paramekkavu and Thiruvambadi Devaswoms. From the next year onwards, it was renamed as Thrissur Pooram Exhibition.

Participating companies
Major participating companies include private and Government companies and departments. Some are Oushadhi, Coir Board, Kerala Police, Kerala Excise, Indian Railways, 
All India Radio, Bharat Petroleum, Bharat Electronics, Bharat Earth Movers,
Bharat Sanchar Nigam, Kerala Forest Department, Food Corporation of India,
Coconut Development Board, Hindustan Newsprint Limited, Kerala Agricultural University, Hindustan Aeronautics Limited, Indian Income-tax Department,
Department of Industries (Kerala), Kerala State Pollution Control Board, 
Indian Space Research Organisation, Kerala Veterinary and Animal Sciences University,
and Jubilee Mission Medical College and Research Institute

Ticket price
In 2012, the ticket cost Rs 5 but increased in 2013 to Rs 10. On Pooram day it will cost Rs 15. The exhibition will be open from 10 AM to 9 PM. Around 188 stalls and 80 pavilions have been set up in 2013 for the exhibition. There are amusement rides for children and food stalls are also there in the exhibition. The exhibition is managed by a committee comprising nominees of Devaswoms, the Thrissur Municipal Corporation, the Cochin Devaswom Board, representatives of social organisations, Government officials and the public.

References

Agricultural shows
Economy of Thrissur
Trade fairs in India
1932 establishments in India
exhibition